Verrucobunus is a genus of harvestmen in the family Sclerosomatidae from islands of East and Southeast Asia.

Species
 Verrucobunus boninensis (S. Suzuki, 1978)
 Verrucobunus similis (S. Suzuki, 1978)
 Verrucobunus trispinosus Roewer, 1931

References

Harvestmen
Harvestman genera